Anthony Christopher may refer to:

 Tony Christopher, Baron Christopher (born 1925), British businessman, trade unionist and tax official
 Anthony (Tony) Christopher (born 1952), CEO and president of Landmark Entertainment Group